Martin Hannett's Personal Mixes is a compilation album by Joy Division, said to consist of studio snippets and what are hyped as alternative mixes of Joy Division made by Martin Hannett, their producer. Their authenticity and provenance is debatable and unknown.

Track listing
CD (Interstate 10797) and double LP (Ozit)
 "Synth Tone" – 0:16
 "Hannett's Lift Recording 1" – 1:47
 "Keyboard Doodles" – 4:20
 "Lift Recording 2" – 2:36
 "Number False Start 1" – 0:48
 "Curtis, Hannett, Gretton Interplay, Chit Chat and Cup Smashing" – 1:13
 "Hannett Speaks" – 0:34
 "Number False Start 2" – 0:06
 "From Safety to Where" – 2:28
 "Autosuggestion" – 6:09
 "Heart and Soul" – 5:51
 "N4 Europop" – 6:10
 "24 Hours" – 4:28
 "Passover" – 4:46
 "N4" – 6:08
 "N4 (Vers. 2)" – 6:07
 "The Eternal" – 6:20
 "The Eternal (Vers. 2)" – 6:14

References

Joy Division compilation albums
Albums produced by Martin Hannett
2007 compilation albums